Counting the Days may refer to:

 Counting the Days (EP), a 2007 EP by Marah, or the title song
 "Counting the Days" (Collective Soul song), 2004
 "Counting the Days", a song by Good Charlotte from the album Cardiology
 "Counting the Days", a song by Bic Runga from her 2002 album Beautiful Collision